Czechoslovakia competed at the 1973 World Aquatics Championships in Belgrade from August 31 to September 9.

Medalists

Diving

Swimming

References

Competition results

World Aquatics Championships
Nations at the 1973 World Aquatics Championships
1973